Molly E.E. Wieland (born 1934), is a female former diver who competed for England.

Diving career
She represented England and won a bronze medal in the 10 metres platform at the 1958 British Empire and Commonwealth Games in Cardiff, Wales.

References

1934 births
English female divers
Cyclists at the 1958 British Empire and Commonwealth Games
Commonwealth Games medallists in diving
Commonwealth Games bronze medallists for England
Living people
Medallists at the 1958 British Empire and Commonwealth Games